El Ghicha District is a district of Laghouat Province, Algeria.

Municipalities
The district is further divided into 1 municipality:
El Ghicha

References

Districts of Laghouat Province